An hourglass is one of the oldest devices for measuring time.

Hourglass or hour glass may also refer to:

 Hourglass shape

Music
Hour Glass (band), a 1960s rock band featuring Duane and Gregg Allman

Albums
Hourglass (America album), 1994
Hourglass (Dave Gahan album), 2007
Hourglass: Remixes, by David Gahan, 2008
Hourglass (Fayray album), 2004
Hour Glass (Hour Glass album), 1967
Hourglass (James Taylor album), 1997
Hourglass (Kate Rusby album), 1997
Hourglass (Mako album), 2016
Hourglass: The Anthology, a box set by Lamb of God, 2010
Hourglass, by Athenaeum, 2002
Hourglass, by Glass Harp, 2003
The Hourglass, an EP by Leæther Strip packaged with their album The Giant Minutes to the Dawn, 2007
Hourglass, Song by Clique Productions, 2023

Songs
"Hourglass" (Clannad song), 1989
"Hourglass" (Disclosure song), 2015
"Hourglass" (Squeeze song), 1987
"Hourglass", by At The Drive-In from In/Casino/Out, 1998
"Hourglass", by Catfish and the Bottlemen from The Balcony, 2014
"Hourglass", by Erra from Drift, 2016
"Hourglass", by Lamb of God from Ashes of the Wake, 2004
"Hourglass", by Liquid Tension Experiment from Liquid Tension Experiment 2, 1999
"Hourglass", by Live Alien Broadcast, 1999
"Hourglass", by Motionless in White from Graveyard Shift, 2017
"Hourglass", by P-Model from Karkador, 1985
"Hourglass", by A Perfect Circle from Eat the Elephant, 2018
"Hourglass", by Queensrÿche from Condition Hüman, 2015
"The Hourglass", by Savatage from The Wake of Magellan, 1998

Arts and entertainment
"Hourglass" (Smallville), an episode of the American television series Smallville
Hour Glass (TV series), a 1946–1947 television variety show
 The Hour-Glass, a 1905 painting by Evelyn De Morgan
Hourglass, a 1995 film directed by C. Thomas Howell
"Hourglass", a 2004 episode from season 3 of Alias

Books
Hourglass (Gray novel), a 2010 novel by Claudia Gray
Hourglass (Kiš novel), a 1972 novel by Danilo Kiš
The Hourglass, a supervillain character from the 2008 film, Superhero Movie

Space
Engraved Hourglass Nebula, a planetary nebula
Hourglass Nebula, part of the Lagoon Nebula
Hourglass Sea, an early name for Syrtis Major Planum, a feature of Mars

Women's fashion
Hourglass corset, a type of undergarment
Hourglass figure, a description of a female body shape

Zoology
Hourglass dolphin (Lagenorynchus cruciger), a small dolphin found in Antarctic and sub-Antarctic waters
Hourglass toad or Cross toad (Leptophryne borbonica), a species of toad native to southeast Asia

Other
 Hourglass (newspaper), a free monthly British newspaper published by Extinction Rebellion
 Hourglass Device, a United States military award, attached to the Armed Forces Reserve Medal
 Hourglass Field, a landing field outside San Diego, California, United States
 Hourglass formation, a type of formation in modern western square dance
 The Hour Glass Limited, a Singapore-based luxury watch retailer
 Hourglass model, to explain the phylotypic stage in evolutionary developmental biology
 The translation of שְׁעוֹן הַחוֹל (pronounced Sha'on HaḤol) the project name for the Egypt–Israel barrier

See also
Sandglass (disambiguation)